Dragon Ball Z: Shin Budokai, released as  in Japan, is a fighting video game part of the Dragon Ball Z franchise, and was released on March 7, 2006, developed by Dimps. The story mode is based on the events of the Dragon Ball Z movie Fusion Reborn. The players follow the events of the story in which they encounter many Dragon Ball Z characters, including Goku and Vegeta. The choices that you make determine how the story evolves.

The Arcade Mode, is a single-player mode that allows the player to battle computer controlled (CPU) fighters, in order to gain Dragon Balls.

The Z Trial mode allows the player to either survive an unending wave of enemies for as long as possible, or to defeat as many enemies possible within an assigned time slot.

There are also customization options present, in the form of the "Profile Card". This allows the player to design their own card and customize it with items from the in-game item store.

Versus mode
Dragon Ball Z: Shin Budokai was produced by Osaka-based Japanese video game production company Dimps, who notably produced several other Dragon Ball games, including Dragon Ball: Xenoverse and Dragon Ball: Xenoverse 2.

Dragon Road
Dragon Road is the title of the game's single-player campaign. The game takes inspiration from the plot of the Dragon Ball movie, entitled "Fusion Reborn". As the player progresses, they will find themselves participating in fights, either for friendly competition or against enemies. The campaign begins with a portal from hell, opening up on the earth, and the dead being resurrected. Goku and his allies must fight their way through, arenas such as the plains of earth, or the ruins of hell. The Dragon Road consists of a total of 5 chapters.

Training Mode
The training mode allows the players to battle CPU (computer-controlled enemies) to hone their skills.

Several options are afforded to the player which they may tweak as they see fit, these include:

 Health: The amount of health either player begins the fight with, there are 7 total bars of health for each competitor. 
 Starting Ki: How much energy the player wishes to begin the battle with. There are 7 bars of Ki for each competitor.
 Check Energy: The amount of Ki needed to teleport behind an enemy to dodge their attack, the default consumption is 3/7 of the Ki bar.

Network Battle Mode
Network Battle Mode allows the player to have wireless battles with their friends. The player may also add friends to their profile card, which displays their victory ratio. Each battle won will raise the players' power level.

Arcade
The objective of the arcade mode is to collect all 7 dragon balls. The player is forced to fight 10 opponents in a row, in a ladder-like setting, such as the arcade mode present in Mortal Kombat. Occasionally, depending on the existing in-world relationships between each character, there may be short dialogue scenes.

Time Attack
In Time Attack, the player must fight 7 courses of enemies and defeat them as fast as possible.

Survival
Survival allows the player to fight nonstop hordes of enemies until they lose, after a certain number of wins, their health will stop regenerating all 7 bars.

Profile Card
Here, the player can create a special ID card that is used during Network Battles. It records the players data, battles won, battles lost, Survival Records, Time Attacks, Rankings in Dragon Road, Power Level, Friends, Money, and the players Victory Ratio. The player can also buy stamps from the shop to customize them to their liking.

Playable characters
 
 
Goku
Vegeta
Teen Gohan
Gohan
Pikkon
Android 18
Krillin
Trunks
Piccolo
Frieza
Cell
Kid Buu
Cooler
Broly
Gotenks
Vegito
Gogeta
Janemba

Reception

The game received generally positive reviews, with Metacritic citing its accessibility and its single player story, which according to Metacritic critic "Deeko", contained "hours of fun".

Although, the game has been criticized for its fighting system, with IGN critic Chris Roper describing it as "limited" and "basic."

External links
Dragon Ball Z: Shin Budokai at IGN.com
Dragon Ball Z: Shin Budokai at Gamespot.com

References

2006 video games
Bandai Namco games
Dimps games
Dragon Ball Z: Budokai
PlayStation Portable games
PlayStation Portable-only games
Fighting games
Video games developed in Japan
Video game sequels